Matebeng is a community council located in the Qacha's Nek District of Lesotho. Its population in 2006 was 1,735.

Villages
The community of Matebeng includes the villages of Ha Lelingoana (Ha Madala), Ha Lelingoana (Makhaleng), Ha Lelingoana (Moreneng), Ha Libete, Ha Mahamo, Ha Mofolo, Ha Nkofo, Ha Sefaha, Ha Tomose, Ha Tsolo, Ha Wana, Maphotong, Matlakeng and Mosamaqa.

References

External links
 Google map of community villages

Populated places in Qacha's Nek District